Greenawalt is a surname. Notable people with the surname include:

Abraham Greenawalt (1834–1922), Union Army soldier
R. Kent Greenawalt (born 1936), American civil rights lawyer and academic
Randy Greenawalt (1949–1997), American serial killer executed in Arizona
Roger Greenawalt (born 1960), American musician

See also
Greenawalt Building, a building in Harrisburg, Pennsylvania, United States